Black Hammock may refer to

Places
United States
 Black Hammock Island, island in Jacksonville, Florida
 Black Hammock Wilderness Area, area in Seminole County, Florida